Manea may refer to:

 Manea, Cambridgeshire, a village in the District of Fenland, Cambridgeshire, England
 Manea (name), both a surname and a given name
 MANEA, an enzyme
 Manea River, a tributary of the Crasna River in Romania
 a singular form of Romanian music genre Manele

See also 
 Mania (disambiguation)